Euthamia gymnospermoides, with the common names Great Plains goldentop and Texas goldentop, is a plant in the family Asteraceae.

It is native primarily to the Great Plains and Great Lakes Region where it is found in prairies and sandy areas.

Euthamia gymnospermoides is a perennial that produces heads of yellow flowers in late summer. It is distinguished from the similar Euthamia graminifolia by having only one vein per leaf and larger flower heads.

References

External links
 United States Department of Agriculture Plants Profile for Euthamia gymnospermoides (Texas goldentop)
 Lady Bird Johnson Wildflower Center Native Plant Information Network–—NPIN: Euthamia gymnospermoides —Texas goldentop
Photo of plant specimen at Missouri Botanical Garden, collected in Indian Territory (now Oklahoma) in 1894, isotype of Euthamia gymnospermoides

gymnospermoides
Flora of the United States
Flora of Ontario
Plants described in 1902
Flora without expected TNC conservation status